The initials LHS are used for:

Australia
 Leumeah High School, New South Wales
 Lyneham High School, Australian Capital Territory

United Kingdom
 Litherland High School, Liverpool, England
 Larbert High School, Stenhousemuir, Scotland

United States
 Lafayette High School (disambiguation)  
 Lahainaluna High School, Maui Hawai’i
 Lamar High School (disambiguation)
 Lanphier High School, Springfield,IL
 Lawrence High School (New Jersey)
 Lebanon High School (disambiguation)
 Lee High School (disambiguation)
 Longmeadow High School
 Legacy High School (disambiguation)
 Lejeune High School, Jacksonville, North Carolina
 Lexington High School (disambiguation)
 Linganore High School, Frederick Co, Maryland
 Lowell High School (disambiguation)
 Ludington High School
 Lufkin High School
 Lynnwood High School, Lynnwood, Washington
 Lynwood High School, Lynwood, California

Science and mathematics
 Luyten Half-Second catalogue, a star catalogue system
 Latin hypercube sampling, in statistics
 Left hand side, side of an equation

Transportation
Limehouse station, London, National Rail station code LHS
Linia Hutnicza Szerokotorowa, a broad gauge railway line in Poland
Chrysler LHS, a luxury automobile of the 1990s
M1120 HEMTT Load Handling System, a variant of heavy truck
LHS, hydraulic fluid formerly used in Citroën vehicles

Other uses
 Langley High School (disambiguation)
 LHS Telekommunikation, a Swedish telecommunications company
 Left-hand side of something, in particular the left-hand side and right-hand side of an equation in mathematics